Pitsford School, established 1989, is a co-educational, 3-18 independent school in Pitsford, Northamptonshire. Originally called Northamptonshire Grammar School, the school changed its name to Pitsford School in September 2011. Pitsford School is run by the Northamptonshire Independent Grammar School Charity Trust, set up on 27 July 1998. The trust was registered with the Charity Commission in August 1988 to promote and provide for the advancement of education. On 6 September 1989, the school opened with 47 boys admitted across three year groups, Y7-9. The founding Headmaster was Malcolm Tozer, the current headmaster is Craig Walker.

History 
The main building is the Georgian Pitsford Hall, built in 1764 for Colonel James Money. The architect was John Johnson who also designed Kingsthorpe Hall and the County (or City) Rooms in Leicester. A private house and estate until it was sold to the Polish order of the Holy Family of Nazareth who set up the Holy Family of Nazareth Convent School in 1947. This school closed in 1984 and the estate was bought by Northamptonshire Independent Grammar School Charity Trust Ltd, who opened the new school on Wednesday 6 September 1989. Initially the school was boys only but admitted girls ten years later in 1999.

Pitsford School was founded by Malcolm Robinson with support from patrons Christian Lady Hesketh OBE, DL, and Sir Hereward Wake Bart, MC, DL.

The school maintains a meteorological station, Pitsford Hall weather station, which was founded in 1998. The station is run by Sixth Form pupils as a long-term community service project and receives the patronage of broadcast meteorologist Alex Deakin.

Curriculum 

Pitsford School offers GCSE and A Level examinations. Most students progress to Higher Education, with annually 66% to World Ranked Universities and 9.5% to Oxbridge/UCL.

Buildings 
As the school grew, new buildings were added to accommodate the increasing pupil numbers.

The Michael Robinson Memorial Library was built in 1992. The Foundation stone was dedicated by Her Majesty Queen Elizabeth The Queen Mother during a ceremony in the school Gymnasium, shortly before the building was completed on 30 June 1992.

The Sunley Science and Technology was built in 1998. The guest of honour at the official opening was ex-Prime minister Baroness Margaret Thatcher.

The Duckworth Building was completed in February 2012 and houses the Junior School. This building celebrates the support since the founding of the School of Keith Duckworth and his family. It is situated on the old orchard site to the North of Pitsford Hall.

Notable visitors

Queen Mother 

On 30 June 1992 Her Majesty Queen Elizabeth The Queen Mother visited Northamptonshire Grammar School and laid the Foundation stone of the Michael Robinson Memorial Library. The Queen Mother regularly visited Pitsford Hall in the twenties and thirties as a guest of Captain Drummond, Master of the Pytchley Hunt. The small conservatory at the front of the house was added by Captain Drummond so that the then Queen Mother, Queen Mary, could watch her granddaughters' riding lessons on the front lawn. This was renovated in time for the Royal Visit. The school now awards the Queen Elizabeth the Queen Mother Scholarship.

Reference List

External links 
 School website

Private schools in West Northamptonshire District
Educational institutions established in 1989
1989 establishments in England